Fort Salonga is a hamlet and census-designated place (CDP) in the Towns of Huntington and Smithtown in Suffolk County, on the North Shore of Long Island, in New York, United States. The population was 10,008 at the 2010 census. 

The hamlet is considered the easternmost part of the historic Gold Coast of Long Island, with the Geissler Estate being located within the hamlet.

History 
One night during the Revolutionary War, Colonial forces landed on the beach in nearby Crab Meadow, and moving down the beach overtook the fort.

In the post-Civil War era the rich red clay deposits gave birth to a successful brickworks as well as other trade. Barges loaded with manure swept from the streets of New York City would arrive, and farmers from nearby towns would come to get the manure for fertilizer. The emptied barges were then loaded with bricks for the trip back to the city. One of the brick companies to operate there in the late 19th century was owned by the Brown family, whose bricks bore the initials BBB for Brown's Best Bricks. The family home on the top of the hill on Breeze Hill Road has served as the clubhouse for the Indian Hills Country Club since 1963.

The hamlet's name 
The name evolved from the Revolutionary War-era British Fort Salonga, or Fort Slongo, (named after one of the fort’s architects) once located near the border of the towns of Huntington and Smithtown, overlooking the Long Island Sound.

The area was formerly known as Fresh Pond.

Geography

The Fort Salonga CDP includes the hamlet of Crab Meadow.

Demographics

At the 2000 census, there were 9,634 people, 3,225 households, and 2,715 families residing in the CDP. The population density was 1,068.8 per square mile (412.8/km2). There were 3,310 housing units at an average density of 367.2/sq mi (141.8/km2). The racial makeup of the CDP was 96.83% White, 0.61% African American, 0.05% Native American, 1.71% Asian, 0.28% from other races, and 0.51% from two or more races. Hispanic or Latino of any race were 2.25% of the population.

There were 3,225 households, out of which 37.9% had children under the age of 18 living with them, 75.8% were married couples living together, 6.1% had a female householder with no husband present, and 15.8% were non-families. 12.0% of all households were made up of individuals, and 4.6% had someone living alone who was 65 years of age or older. The average household size was 2.96 and the average family size was 3.22.

In the CDP, the population was spread out, with 25.9% under the age of 18, 5.1% from 18 to 24, 27.6% from 25 to 44, 29.8% from 45 to 64, and 11.5% who were 65 years of age or older. The median age was 40 years. For every 100 females, there were 98.1 males. For every 100 females age 18 and over, there were 97.8 males.

Fort Salonga is an affluent location, with a median family income for a household in the CDP of $98,128, and the median income for a family was $106,253. Males had a median income of $70,663 versus $51,694 for females. The per capita income for the CDP was $41,933. About 2.5% of families and 3.3% of the population were below the poverty line, including 5.4% of those under age 18 and 1.5% of those age 65 or over.

Education 
The portion of Fort Salonga located within the Town of Huntington is located within the boundaries of (and is thus served by) the Northport-East Northport Union Free School District, while the portion located within the Town of Smithtown is located within the boundaries of (and is thus served by) the Kings Park Central School District. As such, children who reside within Fort Salonga and attend public schools go to school in one of these two districts, depending on where they live within Fort Salonga.

The school district boundary within Fort Salonga overlaps with the town boundaries, following Bread and Cheese Hollow Road.

References

External links 

 Fort Salonga Association official website

Huntington, New York
Smithtown, New York
Long Island Sound
Census-designated places in New York (state)
Hamlets in New York (state)
Census-designated places in Suffolk County, New York
Hamlets in Suffolk County, New York
Populated coastal places in New York (state)